Westernach is a river in Baden-Württemberg, Germany. It is created at the confluence of the rivers Rottum and Dürnach near Laupheim. It flows into the Danube near Erbach an der Donau.

See also
List of rivers of Baden-Württemberg

References

Rivers of Baden-Württemberg
Rivers of Germany